Hypostromatia is a genus of moths belonging to the family Tortricidae.

Species
Hypostromatia versicolorana Zeller, 1866

See also
List of Tortricidae genera

References

External links

tortricidae.com

Cochylini
Tortricidae genera